Mohamed Ben Brahim was a Moroccan footballer who played for French clubs FC Sète, Besançon RC and FC Nancy as a defensive midfielder.

References

1920 births
People from Oujda
Association football midfielders
Moroccan footballers
FC Sète 34 players
Racing Besançon players
FC Nancy players
Ligue 1 players
Ligue 2 players
Possibly living people
Moroccan expatriate footballers
Moroccan expatriate sportspeople in France
Expatriate footballers in France